William Braithwaite Roberts (27 September 1914 – 23 August 1951) played first-class cricket for Lancashire as a lower-order batsman and left-arm spin bowler between 1939 and 1949.

While serving in the Army during the Second World War Roberts showed good form in the cricket matches he was able to take part in, and he was chosen to play for England in three of the Victory Tests in 1945. He had four successful seasons for Lancashire from 1946 to 1949, taking almost 400 wickets, but the younger left-arm spinners Malcolm Hilton and Bob Berry replaced him in the county team, and he returned to club cricket in 1951. After illness and an operation he died in August that year, aged 36.

He became famous when he dismissed Australian batsman Don Bradman in 1948. He took 6 for 73 off 42 overs in the Australians' first innings, then on the last day he held out against the bowling of Ray Lindwall to give Lancashire a draw. His best first-class figures were 8 for 50 (match figures of 51.5–23–83–11) for Lancashire against Oxford University in 1949.

References

External links
 
 

1914 births
1951 deaths
English cricketers
Lancashire cricketers
North v South cricketers
British Army personnel of World War II